Allosmaitia wildei, the small oakblue or white oakblue, is a butterfly of the family Lycaenidae. It is found in Irian Jaya, western New Guinea, and from Cape York to Innisfail in northern Queensland, Australia.

Their wingspan is about 30 mm.

Their larvae feed on ant eggs, and probably also the larvae. They live in the arboreal nests of the ant species Polyrhachis queenslandica.

Subspecies
Arhopala wildei wildei (Australia, from Cape York to Kuranda)
Arhopala wildei soda (Tagula, Woodlark Island)
Arhopala wildei neva (New Guinea)

External links
Australian Insects
Australian Faunal Directory

Arhopala
Butterflies of Oceania
Butterflies described in 1891